During the 1940–41 season Hibernian, a football club based in Edinburgh, came third out of 16 clubs in the Southern Football League.

Southern League

Final League table

Southern League Cup

Group stage

Group D final table

Summer Cup

See also
List of Hibernian F.C. seasons

References

External links
Hibernian 1940/1941 results and fixtures, Soccerbase

Hibernian F.C. seasons
Hibernian